The Napier Javelin was a British six-cylinder inline air-cooled engine designed by Frank Halford and built by D. Napier & Son. First flown in March 1934 in the prototype of the Percival Mew Gull racing aircraft, the engine was also used in the Spartan Arrow biplane and the Percival Gull.

Development and design
In 1930 D. Napier & Son identified a market for light aircraft engines, noting that light aircraft cost much the same as their cars used to and were being purchased by much the same class of gentleman. Frank Halford had been engaged as consultant designer and now began work on an air-cooled inverted six-cylinder design. Following a change of personnel, the engine was given the go-ahead in 1932, with aircraft manufacturer de Havilland identified as a likely customer.

Unlike the later de Havilland Gipsy Six the poppet valves were operated by a single gear driven overhead camshaft.

The engine was first named the E97 and introduced to the market in 1932. However none were sold and, after slight modifications, it was reintroduced the next year as the Javelin.

Development continued but only a few were sold for experimental and prototype aircraft.

By 1935 Napier's needed to refocus their efforts and, with Halford's broadly similar but more powerful de Havilland Gipsy Six now on the market, the Javelin was withdrawn.

Variants

E.97
Initial version offered in 1932.

Javelin I
First version bearing the Javelin name, producing .

Javelin III

Javelin IIIA
A Mark III with a starter motor, generator and other improvements for the Martin Baker MB.1.

Applications
Martin-Baker M.B.1 (Javelin IIIA)
Percival Gull Four Mk.IIA (Javelin III)
Percival Mew Gull Mk.I 
Spartan Arrow (E.97) 
Cockatoo Dockyard L.J.W.7 Codock

Specifications (Javelin I)

See also

References

Notes

Bibliography

 Lumsden, Alec. British Piston Engines and their Aircraft. Marlborough, Wiltshire: Airlife Publishing, 2003. .

Aircraft air-cooled inline piston engines
1930s aircraft piston engines
Inverted aircraft piston engines
Javelin
Straight-six engines